Darina Nikolaeva Yotova (born September 9, 1998), better known by her stage name Dara is a Bulgarian pop singer, who rose to fame in late 2015 after reaching the final in the Bulgarian edition of The X Factor. She is currently signed to Virginia Records and in 2016 she released her debut single "K'vo Ne Chu" under the label.

Career

2015–16: X–Factor
Born in Varna, in 2015 Darina participated in the Bulgarian version of the reality show The X Factor where she finished third, with Bulgarian rapper Krisko being her mentor.

2016–present: Early career
Following her departure from The X Factor, Darina signed a record deal with Bulgarian music label Virginia Records and adopted the stage name Dara. In the summer of 2016, she released her debut single "K'vo Ne Chu", accompanied by a music video. A few weeks later, the single peaked the Bulgarian charts and a subsequent English version of the song by the name of "Onto You" was released on September 29, directed towards an international audience.

On March 12, 2017, Dara released her second single entitled "Rodena Takava", also accompanied by a music video. A few months later, on July 21, she made her first guest appearance on a single named "Nyama Da Si Tragnesh S Drug" by labelmates Plamen & Ivo alongside Bulgarian hip-hop duo Pavell and Venci Venc'. On September 29, Dara's third single "Nedei" was released on YouTube with an official music video. On June 20, 2018, Dara released her fourth single entitled “Vse Na Men”, along with a music video.

In early 2020, Dara starred in the Bulgarian TV show Kato Dve Kapki Voda.

Since 2021, Dara has been a coach on The Voice of Bulgaria. In 2022, on the ninth season, Jacklyn Tarrakci, a member of Team Dara, won the competition. This made Dara the winning coach.

On March 7, 2022, Dara announced her debut album “Rodena Takava” set to be released on April 20, 2022, accompanied with a live concert showcasing the album in Joy Station, Sofia.

In March 2023 Kai released his solo album Rover (EP) with title song beeing based over Dara's song "Mr. Rover".

Discography

Singles

As lead artist

As featured artist

Music videos

References

1998 births
Living people
X Factor (Bulgarian TV series)
Musicians from Varna, Bulgaria